Hilda Charlton (1906January 29, 1988) was a spiritual teacher, author, dancer, and healer who taught classes in meditation and prayer in New York City for 23 years.

Biography
Hilda was born in London in 1906, and moved to the United States with her parents when she was 4 years old. She was raised in Salt Lake City, Utah, and Los Angeles, California. At the age of 18, she began performing as a modern dancer. For the next 20 years, she danced and taught in the San Francisco area.

Hilda toured India as a dancer from 1947 to 1950, and stayed in India for fifteen more years, studying eastern mysticism and meditation. She was guided by great spiritual masters and holy people, including Nityananda of Ganeshpuri, Sri Mahadevanansa of Bombay, and Sai Baba of Puttaparthi

Hilda settled in New York City upon returning to America. She became a spiritual teacher at the request of people she met, and over the years her classes grew in size from two people to more than a thousand.  The location was moved from a student's apartment to the basement of St. Luke's Church.  In 1976, the location was moved to the nave and later to the Synod House of the Cathedral of St. John the Divine. She was one of the founding members of the Hindu (Ganesh) Temple in Queens, NY,(Hindu Temple Society of North America) the first traditional Hindu temple in North America.

Her teachings incorporated the fundamental principles of the world's religions. Foremost in her classes, she stressed the importance of a life of giving and forgiving, unconditional love, and remembrance of God. Hilda's lectures included poignant stories of her life, practical lessons for everyday living, guidance in prayer, and meditation. Her style combined humor, practicality, and deep insight into the human mind a spirit.

Her teachings had a profound effect on the lives of thousands of people from all walks of life. Alcoholics and drug addicts were known to conquer their addictions, prostitutes left the street, and those afflicted with serious diseases often reported experiencing remission and cure. She took no personal credit for these miracles, giving all credit to God.

Her teaching are still available to be heard from the hundreds of audio recordings, several videos and seven books, through the website dedicated to keeping her work available at www.hildacharlton.com.

She died in New York City on January 29, 1988.

Hilda taught and shared with many spiritual teachers including Ram Das in the 70's, Robert Hansen (Sivaya Subramuniyaswami) and Albert Rudolph (Rudi) to name a few.

Books
Saints Alive, by Hilda Charlton
The New Sun, by Hilda Charlton
Master Hilarion, by Hilda Charlton
Skanda, by Hilda Charlton
Divine Mother Speaks, by Hilda Charlton
Pioneers Of The Soul, by Hilda Charlton
Hell Bent For Heaven, by Hilda Charlton

References

External links

Hilda Charlton official site
Online Discussion Group
Hilda Charlton on YouTube.com

1906 births
1988 deaths
American spiritual teachers
Spiritual teachers